Lutfi Lepaja (born 20 May 1945 in , a village near Podujevo, DFR Yugoslavia.) is a Kosovo Albanian writer. Lepaja is author of more than ten works (novels, essays, poetry, plays, etc.).

Biography 
Lutfi Lepaja finished elementary and secondary school in Stari Trg and Kosovska Mitrovica. For his literary formation responds with full sense the word "autodidact". He deals with five artistic literary genres: novel, story, essay, poetry, and journalism. He is typical author "discovered" by anonymous literary competitions and on almost all these genres was awarded more than once. Radio Pristina realised three of his plays, also his monodrama Ruleti kosovar was put om stage on many local theaters, and the same was also staged at the International Monodrama Festival in Korçë (Albania), in 2010. He has many unpublished works ready there waiting for publishing. He also collaborates with web-based newspaper "JAVA" and publishes his works mainly there.

Published works 

Parimi i Pritjes
Përqafim i padukshëm
Kona
Tepër Serioz
Gëte ka të drejtë
Granias Lament
Shkollë për specialistë
Ngutja në jetë
Valëza e Lumit
Zero zero
Zinxhiri i këputur
Panairi i ideve
Kopili
Ruleti kosovar

References

Living people
1945 births
Kosovo Albanians
People from Podujevo
Yugoslav people of Albanian descent
Albanian-language writers
Kosovan poets
Kosovan writers
Kosovan dramatists and playwrights
Kosovan essayists